Wolfgang Heinz (born 23 April 1942 in Pforzheim) is a German criminologist and writer on jurisprudence.

References

External links
Publications

1942 births
German criminologists
Jurists from Baden-Württemberg
People from Pforzheim
Living people
German male writers